The Caspar U.1 (sometimes known as the Caspar-Heinkel U.1) was a 1920s German patrol seaplane designed by Ernst Heinkel and built by Caspar-Werke. The U.1 was designed to fit into a cylindrical container to allow it to be carried, then launched from a submarine.

Development
To reduce the time to launch the aircraft, it was built as a cantilever biplane to remove the need to rig struts and wires on assembly. The U.1 had two single-step floats and was powered by a front-mounted  Siemens radial piston engine. The pilot had an open cockpit behind the upper wing which gave a clear view forward. It is claimed that during tests, four men could remove the U.1 from the container and erect it in 1 minute 3 seconds. Two aircraft were bought by the United States Navy for evaluation; these were delivered to Naval Air Station Anacostia in late 1922, and were tested during 1923; one of the aircraft was damaged beyond repair whilst mounted on a truck for a parade.

Operators

Reichsmarine

United States Navy

Specifications

See also

References

Notes

Bibliography

Floatplanes
1920s German military reconnaissance aircraft
Submarine-borne aircraft
U1
Biplanes
Single-engined tractor aircraft
Aircraft first flown in 1922